Joseph Edward Billings was an architect in Boston, Massachusetts, in the mid-19th century. Among his business partners were his brother Hammatt Billings and Charles Frederick Sleeper. He served in the Massachusetts Volunteer Militia and belonged to the Boston Artists' Association.

Designs

J.E. Billings
 Church of the Messiah, Florence St., Boston, 1847
 Ingraham School, Sheafe St., Boston , Massachutes, 1847
 Odd Fellows Hall, Boston
 Chimney, Boston Navy Yard, 1857

Billings & Billings
 Temple Club, West St., Boston
 Boston Museum
 Grace Episcopal Church, Lawrence, Massachusetts, 1851
 Cathedral Building, Boston, 1873
 Thayer Library, Braintree, Massachusetts, 1874
 College Hall, Wellesley College, 1875

Billings & Sleeper
 National Theatre, Boston, 1852

References

1880s deaths
Architects from Boston
19th century in Boston
Year of birth missing